Shipwrecked (Italian: Naufraghi) is a 1939 Italian drama film directed by Silvio Laurenti Rosa. It was shot on location in Genoa using a mixture of professional and amateur actors.

Cast
 Ciro Rovatti as Il cieco
 Alice Maggini as Marta
 Landa Kiss as Anna
 Alberto Collo as Il collega d'ufficio
 Gustavo Serena as L'anziano gaudente
 Daniele Chiapparino
 Elda Cuniberti
 Rosita Forcelli
 Claudio Franchi
 Carmine Romano

References

Bibliography 
 Moliterno, Gino. Historical Dictionary of Italian Cinema. Scarecrow Press, 2008.

External links 
 

1939 drama films
Italian drama films
1939 films
1930s Italian-language films
Italian black-and-white films
1930s Italian films